Oxynoemacheilus kosswigi, the Paphlagonian loach, is a species of ray-finned fish in the genus Oxynoemacheilus. This species is found in the Kizilirmak and Yeşilırmak drainages in northern Anatolia, Turkey. It lives in waters which vary from those with a moderately fast flow to almost still waters and prefers muddy or gravel substrates, It remains abundant and widespread within the two drainage systems in which it occurs but it is suspected that a number f populations may have declined or been made locally extinct by the increasing construction of small hydro-electric dams.

References
 

kosswigi
Endemic fauna of Turkey
Taxa named by Füsun Erk'akan
Taxa named by Mustafa Kuru
Fish described in 1986